Han Sang-ryong was a South Korean wrestler. He competed in the men's freestyle bantamweight at the 1948 Summer Olympics.

References

External links
 

Year of birth missing
Possibly living people
South Korean male sport wrestlers
Olympic wrestlers of South Korea
Wrestlers at the 1948 Summer Olympics
Place of birth missing